The Bangladesh Computer Society (BCS) is regarded as the leading professional and learned society in the field of computers and information systems in Bangladesh. It was established in 1979. The Bangladesh Government Register no -1638(53)/95. This is also a sister society of IEEE Computer Society.

Membership
Five categories of membership to the Society.
 Student member
 Graduate Member
 Associate Member
 Member
 Fellow

BCS Professional Membership is an industry benchmark. Its membership grades begin with Student and Graduate, then move to professional grades with Associate, Member and onto Fellow for highly qualified and experienced practitioners.

BCS and ISEB qualifications help to broaden the knowledge and skills sets of IT professionals.
 Networking
 Member Discounts
 Publications
 Knowledge Services
 Training & Development

Affiliations
 American Association for the Advancement of Science (AAAS)
 American Automatic Control Council (AACC)
 Bangladesh Young Tourist Club (YTC)
 Bangladesh Computer Samity (BCS)
 Bangladesh Medical Association (BMA)
 Computer Training Institute (CTI)

References

External links
 Official web site of Bangladesh Computer Society

Professional associations based in Bangladesh
Science and technology in Bangladesh